"Chelsea Dagger" is a song by Scottish rock band the Fratellis. It was released as the second single from their debut studio album, Costello Music (2006), on 28 August 2006. It is named after Jon Fratelli's wife Heather, a burlesque dancer whose stage name – a play on Britney Spears – he borrowed for the song. Fratelli described the tune as "a rock 'n' roll gig in an old speakeasy or something like that."

This song was number 77 on Rolling Stone's list of the 100 Best Songs of 2007. "Chelsea Dagger" has become notable for its usage in sports. It has also been featured in adverts for Amstel Light and KitKat, the films Run Fatboy Run and Pitch Perfect, a trailer to Shrek the Third, a TV spot for Open Season, an episode of The Inbetweeners, as well as the video games Burnout Dominator and Guitar Hero: On Tour Modern Hits. The song peaked at number 2 on the Scottish Singles Chart and number 5 on the UK Singles Chart and was certified double platinum by the British Phonographic Industry in 2022.

Track listing

Usage in sports

"Chelsea Dagger" is used heavily as a sports anthem. The first team to adopt it was Celtic, for whom the Fratellis are supporters. It has also been adopted at Stamford Bridge, home of Chelsea; Jon Fratelli commented that their use of the song had resulted in the band supporting the club. It is also used by other football teams such as Perth Glory, Major League Soccer franchise Montreal Impact and Cercle Brugge when a goal is scored, while Italian club Juventus used it for more than 8 years and 500 goals, until 15 December 2019.
Currently Sporting Clube de Portugal also use it too. New Zealand club Wellington Phoenix also play the song after every victory by their team.

Outside football, it is best known as the goal song of the National Hockey League's Chicago Blackhawks, first used in 2008–09 NHL season. The song became a sensation during the Blackhawks' first Stanley Cup run in 49 years in 2010. The song was then adopted by the entire Blackhawks' minor league system, as the Rockford IceHogs (AHL) and Indy Fuel (ECHL) clubs.

During the Blackhawks' successful run to the 2013 Stanley Cup, Chicago Symphony Orchestra conductor Riccardo Muti arranged an orchestral version of the song and was performed after the victory, and again after the Blackhawks' 2015 Stanley Cup win. The song was also ranked "best goal song in NHL" by Sports Illustrated.

The success of the Blackhawks has led "Chelsea Dagger" to be adopted as a goal song by the University of North Dakota, as well as the Pensacola Ice Flyers and the Roanoke Rail Yard Dawgs of the SPHL among others. This song is played during Professional Darts Corporation matches shown on ITV4 and at the Hong Kong Sevens. The song is also played after every try scored at European Championship home games of the Leinster Rugby club in the RDS Dublin Ireland. It was also a favorite of the now defunct LSUA Rugby Club which made a Championship run in each of its seasons in NSCRO.

It is also used by the Georgia Swarm of the National Lacrosse League after the team scores a goal at all home games. While the song is played, fans hold their arms out in the air and move them up and down, similar to that of cartoon character Johnny Bravo. This also occurs at the home games of the Brisbane Broncos rugby league team.

The song was regularly played during ITV4's coverage of the PDC darts events. Sky Sports had popularised the use of "Chase the Sun" by Planet Funk as 'the darts song', but when ITV4 picked up the rights to certain tournaments, they opted instead to use "Chelsea Dagger" for their intros and outros.

Charts

Weekly charts

Year-end charts

Certifications

References

External links
 

2006 songs
2006 singles
The Fratellis songs
Chicago Blackhawks
Songs written by Jon Fratelli